Hallaxa fuscescens is a species of sea slug or dorid nudibranch, a marine gastropod mollusk in the family Actinocyclidae.

There is some doubt regarding the correct taxonomic classification of this species.

Distribution
This species is found in the tropical Indo-Pacific Ocean.

Description

Ecology

References

Actinocyclidae
Gastropods described in 1871